The National Health may refer to:

 The National Health (play), a 1969 British play written by Peter Nichols
 The National Health (film), the 1973 movie adaptation of the play
 The National Health (album), a 2012 album by English band Maxïmo Park
 National Health, an English progressive rock band associated with the Canterbury scene
 National Health (album), their debut album, 1978
 "National Health", a song by the Kinks from their 1979 album Low Budget

See also
 National Health Service